Várkert Stadium is a football stadium in Kisvárda, Hungary. The UEFA category 3 arena is home to the association football side Kisvárda FC. The stadium has a capacity of 2,850.

History
The stadium was planned to be built for HUF 120 million in 2014, however step by step it managed to cost taxpayers a lot more. After categorised as an economically significant investment, another HUF 800 million was awarded in 2014, which grew to 1.5 billion and then 2 billion in a short time. In the end a further 473 million HUF was spent on building a heat pipe system from the nearby thermal water complex - making the total investment HUF 2.5 billion - basically 1 million for each spectator seat.  A typical example how one politician's dream can make others pay for it.

The first Nemzeti Bajnokság I match was played against Ferencváros on the 4th match day of the 2018–19 Nemzeti Bajnokság I.

The first Magyar Kupa match was played on 27 February 2018 in the 2018–19 Magyar Kupa season against Ferencváros. The result was 1-1.

Milestone matches

References

External links 
Magyarfutball.hu 

Football venues in Hungary
Kisvárda FC